La Rösa is a hamlet in the upper part of the Val Poschiavo in the canton of Graubünden, Switzerland. The upper reaches of the Poschiavino river flow through the hamlet.

La Rösa was a post and mule station built in the 17th century as a stopover point for transport on the heavily frequented north–south crossing of the Alps over the Bernina Pass. After the 1910 opening of the Bernina Railway, on a route that bypasses La Rösa, the mule system fell into disuse. The old postal building in the hamlet now houses a hotel, also called La Rösa. Hauptstrasse 29, the modern replacement for the old mule road, still passes by La Rösa.

References

Poschiavo